"All Night" is a song by American DJ Steve Aoki and American singer and songwriter Lauren Jauregui, released on November 17, 2017 through Ultra Records. It was written by Mike Gazzo, Michelle Buzz, Jauregui, Aoki, Justin Gammella, with the production handled by Gazzo and Aoki. It charted on Billboard Dance/Electronic Songs at number nine. The music video was released in January 2018. In March 2018, a three-remix package was released with remixes from Aoki, Alan Walker and Garmiani.

Composition
Musically, "All Night" is an EDM song, with lyrics about finding someone special. Billboards Kate Bain noted "All Night" sees Aoki's returning to "bright-light, electro-house grooves" after the hip-hop influenced production on his Kolony LP. Introduced by their managers, Aoki played different tracks to Jauregui and they exchanged ideas. Jauregui said they had agreed on an unfinished track with a "delicate side" which she then reworked, rewriting lyrics, changing melodies, adding a bridge, and creating the harmonies. She produced the vocals on the track.

Music video
The song's music video was released on January 8, 2018, and features Jauregui pursuing a male lover in a nightclub and Aoki DJing at the same nightclub. The music video premiered on BuzzFeed before being released to YouTube. Billboard called the video "steamy" and "pretty trippy".

Track listing

Charts

Weekly charts

Year-end charts

References

2017 songs
2017 singles
Lauren Jauregui songs
Steve Aoki songs
Songs written by Steve Aoki
Songs written by Lauren Jauregui